Mourera aspera is a species of flowering plant in the family Podostemaceae. It is found in South America.

References 

Podostemaceae
Plants described in 1849
Flora of South America